Rayna is a feminine given name with multiple origins in diverse cultures.

Rayna (Bulgarian: Райна) is a diminutive of Slavic names such as Radka that contain the element rad-, meaning “happy.” Raya, another name with unrelated origins from multiple cultures, is another Bulgarian variant of the name. 

Rayna  can also be derived from a name of Germanic origin. Related masculine forms with the same origins are  Ragnar, Rainer, Rainier, Rayner, or Reinhard. All mean “strong counsel.”

Also spelled Reina or Reyna, it is also a Yiddish name referring to spiritual or ritual purity.

It may refer to:
Rayna Gellert (born 1975), American musician and actress
 Rayna Knyaginya (Rayna Popgeorgieva Futekova (Райна Попгеоргиева Футекова (1856-1917), Bulgarian revolutionary
 Rayna Petkova (Райна Петкова, 1895 – 1957), Bulgarian social worker
 Rayna Kirilova Terziyska (Райна Кирилова Терзийска, Bulgarian singer

See also

Notes

Bulgarian feminine given names